Garruchos may refer to two places in South America:

Garruchos, Corrientes, a municipality in the Santo Tomé Department of province of Corrientes, Argentina
Garruchos, Rio Grande do Sul, a municipality in the western part of the state of Rio Grande do Sul in Brasil